Jacob Nicanor Youmbi E'pandi  (born 1 April 1994), or simply Jacob Youmbi, is a Central African professional footballer who plays as a midfielder for Iraqi Premier League club Naft Al-Basra SC and the Central African Republic national team.

Club career
Youmbi played for Equatorial Guinean club Leones Vegetarianos FC at the 2015 CAF Confederation Cup qualifying rounds.

Honours
Tunisian Cup
 Finalist Tunisian Cup 2017 with Ben Guerdane.

References

External links
 Jacob Youmbi at sport.de

 Jacob Youmbi at safascore.com
 Jacob Youmbi at footbl.com

1994 births
Living people
Citizens of the Central African Republic through descent
Central African Republic footballers
Association football midfielders
Leones Vegetarianos FC players
US Ben Guerdane players
Naft Al-Basra SC players
Al-Kahrabaa FC players
Tunisian Ligue Professionnelle 1 players
Iraqi Premier League players
Central African Republic international footballers
Central African Republic expatriate footballers
Central African Republic expatriate sportspeople in Equatorial Guinea
Expatriate footballers in Equatorial Guinea
Central African Republic expatriate sportspeople in Tunisia
Expatriate footballers in Tunisia
Central African Republic expatriate sportspeople in Iraq
Expatriate footballers in Iraq
Central African Republic people of Cameroonian descent
Sportspeople of Cameroonian descent
Cameroonian footballers
New Star de Douala players
Cameroonian expatriate footballers
Cameroonian expatriate sportspeople in Equatorial Guinea
Cameroonian expatriate sportspeople in Tunisia
Cameroonian expatriate sportspeople in Iraq
Cameroonian people of Central African Republic descent
Sportspeople of Central African Republic descent